Sheikh Dhari Ali al-Fayadh (c. 1918 – June 28, 2005) was the oldest Iraqi Member of Parliament until his assassination in 2005. He was believed to have been 87.

Fayadh had been the leader of a prominent tribe from southern Iraq, the Albu Amer, and was first elected to an Iraqi legislature by the monarchy before it was toppled in 1958. He was elected to the Iraqi Parliament in January 2005 as part of the majority-holding Shiite slate and he served as assembly speaker at one of the assembly's opening sessions.

Fayadh was killed, along with his son and two bodyguards, when a car bomb was rammed into his motorcade. Abu Musab al-Zarqawi's organization claimed the killing.

References

1910s births
2005 deaths
Deaths by car bomb in Iraq
Assassinated Iraqi politicians
Iraqi terrorism victims
Terrorism deaths in Iraq
Members of the Council of Representatives of Iraq